Sylvester Kossów, Kosiv or Kosov (secular name Stefan-Adam Kosaw, ; born Zharobychi, Vitebsk Voivodeship, Polish–Lithuanian Commonwealth, died 13 April 1657) was the Metropolitan of Kiev, Galicia and all Ruthenia in the Ecumenical Patriarchate of Constantinople in the Eastern Orthodox Church from 1647 to 1657. He reigned during the Khmelnytsky uprising.

Education
Kossów was a descendant of a Ruthenian noble family. He studied at the Kyiv and Vilno Brotherhood schools and at the Lublin Jesuit Collegium and Zamość Academy before beginning to teach at the Vilno and Lviv Dormition brotherhood schools. After finishing his education, Kosiv accepted monastic vows at the Saint Trinity Monastery in Vilno. With the opening of the Kyiv Lavra School in 1631, Kosiv be its lecturer on the request of Metropolitan Petro Mohyla becoming its prefect. In 1632–1635 he was the first prefect at the Kyiv Collegium teaching courses on rhetoric and philosophy. At the same time in 1632 Kosiv joined the Kyiv Epiphany Brotherhood.

Bishop Sylvestr
In 1635 he became bishop of Mstislavl, Orsha, and Mahiliow. Following the Union of Brest, the eparchy of Mstislawl, Orsha, and Mahiliow became the only Eastern Orthodox eparchy within the Grand Duchy of Lithuania. In 1647 he became the metropolitan of Kyiv. It happened just before the Khmelnytsky Uprising, a time of uncertainty in Ukraine and in the Ruthenian church.

Kossów himself was strongly opposed to union with Tsardom of Russia, and also against unreserved alliance with Poland. He condemned the 1654 treaty of Pereyaslav between the Cossack Hetmanate and the Tsardom of Muscovy. Despite being critical of some of the policies of the Ukrainian Cossacks, he attempted to rectify the situation and along with the Patriarch of Jerusalem Paiseus gave Bohdan Khmelnytsky a hero's welcome when he entered Kyiv on 2 January 1649 (Old Style 23 December 1648). Kossów strived for an independent Ruthenian Orthodox Church that would be only under the jurisdiction of the Patriarch of Constantinople, and he fought against the subjugation of the Kyiv metropolate to Moscow.

In 1650 Sylvestr headed a delegation of the Orthodox clergy and Kyiv voivode Adam Kysil to the Sejm in Warsaw and contribute to ratification of the 1649 treaty of Zboriv.

Bibliography
  "Exegesis, to iest dawne sprave o szkolach Кiowskich i Winickich" (English: Exegesis, is the old issue on schools of Kyiv and Vinnytsia, 1635) – about the Kyiv Collegium, its program, advantages of studies in Latin and Liberal Arts (so called "septim artes liberalis", Seven Liberal Arts)
  "Paterikon, abo Żywoty ss. ojców pieczarskich" (English: Patericon or the Life of Saint Fathers of [Kyiv] Caves, 1635) – shortened version of the Kyiv Caves Patericon that included list of Metropolitans from Michael (994–998) to Peter Mogila
  "Дидаскалія, альбо наука о седми сакраментах, альбо таїнах" (English: Didascaliae, or a science about the seven sacraments, 1637)

See also
Kuteino Epiphany Monastery (Epiphany Cathedral)

Notelist

External links 
 Sylvestr Kosov at the Encyclopedia of History of Ukraine
 Sylvestr Kosiv at the Encyclopedia of Ukraine
 Andrew Wilson.  The Ukrainians: Unexpected Nation.  Yale University Press, 2002. p 60.

Year of birth unknown
1657 deaths
Metropolitans of Kiev, Galicia and all Rus' (1620-1686)
Eastern Orthodox bishops of Polotsk
Constantinople Exarchs of Ukraine
Orthodox bishops of the Cossack Hetmanate
Belarusian bishops
17th-century Eastern Orthodox bishops
Ruthenian nobility of the Polish–Lithuanian Commonwealth
Belarusian writers
National University of Kyiv-Mohyla Academy alumni
Academic staff of the National University of Kyiv-Mohyla Academy
17th-century Polish writers
People from Shumilina District